Kurt "Kudi" Müller (born 9 May 1948) is a Swiss former footballer who was capped on 38 occasions by the Switzerland national football team, scoring eight goals.

Müller started his career with FC Emmenbrücke and then played for FC Luzern and Grasshopper Club Zürich.

In January 1973, Müller moved to Germany to play club football for Hertha BSC. He went on to make 77 league appearances for the Berlin side over the next two and a half seasons, and in 1974–75 he helped Hertha finish as runners-up in the Bundesliga.

After leaving Hertha, Müller returned to Switzerland to play for Servette FC for the 1975–76 season, and he played for them in the final of the 1975 Coppa delle Alpi tournament, in which they defeated FC Basel 3–0. Müller finished his career with the Bern team BSC Young Boys.

Müller made his international debut for Switzerland on 15 December 1970, in a UEFA Euro 1972 qualifying match against Greece. His final international cap came almost seven years later in a 1978 FIFA World Cup qualification match against Norway on 30 October 1977.

Müller coached SC Kriens in 1986–87. He later became manager at FC Luzern, and he was in charge when they reached the final of the Swiss Cup in 1996–97, although they lost on penalties to FC Sion.

References

1948 births
Living people
Swiss men's footballers
Association football forwards
Switzerland international footballers
Swiss Super League players
Bundesliga players
FC Luzern players
Grasshopper Club Zürich players
Hertha BSC players
Servette FC players
BSC Young Boys players
Swiss expatriate footballers
Expatriate footballers in Germany
Swiss expatriate sportspeople in Germany
Swiss football managers
SC Kriens managers
FC Luzern managers
Sportspeople from Lucerne